Orallo is a river in northern Spain, in the province of León. It runs through a narrow valley just to the west of Orallo, a locality in Villablino municipality.

References 

Rivers of Castile and León
Rivers of Spain